The Book Place was an Australian educational television show for children, which aired on the Seven Network from 1991 to 2003. The show was originally presented by former host of Fat Cat and Friends, Lynn Weston with  Brenton Whittle, and Andy Armstrong, with Michael Scheld as the Bookworm. Television and media personality Nuala Hafner joined the cast in 1997, while Pete Michell and Amelia McFarlane replaced departing cast members in 2002.

See also 
 Between the Lions

References

Seven Network original programming
Australian children's television series
1991 Australian television series debuts
2003 Australian television series endings
Australian television shows featuring puppetry
Television shows set in Adelaide